Centroscymnus is a genus of squaliform sleeper sharks in the family Somniosidae.

Species
 Centroscymnus coelolepis Barbosa du Bocage & Brito Capello, 1864 (Portuguese dogfish)
 Centroscymnus owstonii Garman, 1906 (roughskin dogfish)

References
 

 
Shark genera
Marine fauna of Southern Africa
Marine fish of Southern Australia
Fish of Japan
Marine fish of New Zealand
Taxa named by José Vicente Barbosa du Bocage